The Pool Boys (also known as American Summer) is a 2008 American comedy film directed by James B. Rogers. It stars Matthew Lillard, Brett Davern, Rachelle Lefèvre, Efren Ramirez and Tom Arnold.

Principal photography began in late April 2007, with filming taking place throughout the New Orleans Metropolitan Area. Since wrapping at the end of the following month, the film struggled to find a wide release. The film was released to home media on 2008.

Plot
After Alex Sperling, a Harvard-bound valedictorian, loses his summer internship, he heads to Los Angeles to work for his cousin Roger. Unfortunately, Roger isn't the successful businessman he's made himself out to be (having dropped out of Harvard and becoming a pool boy). After a series of mishaps force Alex and Roger to squat in the mansion of one of Roger's clients, they join forces with a local escort to start an escort business. As the business quickly grows, the boys find themselves trapped in the middle of outlandish situations.

Cast

References

External links
 

2011 comedy films
American comedy films
2011 films
Films shot in New Orleans
Films directed by J. B. Rogers
2010s English-language films
2000s English-language films
2000s American films
2010s American films